Millicent Aroi is a Nauruan diplomat. She served as the High Commissioner of Nauru to Fiji from 1996 to 2004.

Background

Millicent Aroi is the widow of Kenos Aroi, the former President of Nauru. She is a musician and composer.

High Commissioner

Aroi was the Nauruan High Commissioner in Suva, Fiji, serving from 1996 to 2004. This diplomatic post is of ambassadorial rank, although among Commonwealth countries the designation 'High Commissioner' is customarily preferred.

Along with the Ambassadorship to the United Nations held by Marlene Moses, Aroi's tenure of the High Commissioner post means that two of Nauru's most senior diplomatic posts have been held by women.

Millicent Aroi was a delegate at the South Pacific Environment Ministers Meeting on 1–17 August 1995 in Brisbane.

See also

 Politics of Nauru
 Foreign relations of Nauru

References

External links
 Re. Millicent Aroi's diplomatic appointment: 

Living people
High Commissioners of Nauru to Fiji
First ladies of Nauru
Nauruan women diplomats
20th-century women politicians
21st-century women politicians
Year of birth missing (living people)
Women ambassadors